I. lutea may refer to:

 Ibicella lutea, a plant native to South America
 Incarvillea lutea, a plant native to Asia
 Ixia lutea, a cormous plant